
Year 479 (CDLXXIX) was a common year starting on Monday (link will display the full calendar) of the Julian calendar. At the time, it was known as the Year of the Consulship of Zeno without colleague (or, less frequently, year 1232 Ab urbe condita). The denomination 479 for this year has been used since the early medieval period, when the Anno Domini calendar era became the prevalent method in Europe for naming years.

Events 
 By place 
 Britannia 
 Ambrosius Aurelianus, war leader of the Romano-British, is proclaimed king of the Britons (according to Historia Regum Britanniae). He rules probably in the south of Britain, and continues the war against the Anglo-Saxons. 

 Europe 
 King Theodoric the Great starts a 4-year campaign against the Byzantine Empire. The Ostrogoths ravage the Roman provinces (Moesia and Thrace), and threaten the capital of Constantinople itself.
 Julius Nepos, former emperor of the Western Roman Empire, plots military plans in Dalmatia against Odoacer, hoping to regain control of Italy himself.

 Asia 
 Summer – The Song Dynasty ends and the Southern Qi Dynasty begins in southern China. Emperor Shun Di is forced to abandon the throne and Qi Gao Di becomes the first ruler of Southern Qi. Later former Emperor Shun and empress Wang Zhenfeng are killed by the imperial guard, near the vicinity of the capital Jiankang.
 Dongseong becomes king of the Korean kingdom of Baekje.
 Soji becomes king of the Korean kingdom of Silla.

Births 
 Ruan Xiaoxu, bibliography writer (d. 536)

Deaths 
 Samgeun, king of Baekje (Korea)
 Shun Di, emperor of Liu Song (b. 467)
 Wang Zhenfeng, empress of Liu Song (b. 436)
 Yuan He, high official of Northern Wei (b. 403)  
 Yūryaku, emperor of Japan

References